Vital d'Audiguier (Najac, 1565 - Paris, 1624), was a French poet and writer. He was murdered as the result of a brawl over a gambling debt.

d'Audiguier's best known work was a swashbuckling chivalrous novel published anonymously in 1615, entitled Histoire tragi-comique de notre temps, but in subsequent editions titled Histoire des Amours de Lysandre et de Caliste.

References

1565 births
1624 deaths
French male writers